Body and Soul, Live in Berlin is a big band jazz album recorded by the Thad Jones / Mel Lewis Jazz Orchestra, recorded in Berlin in October 1978 and released on the West Wind Jazz label. West Wind also issued the two discs individually as The Orchestra (WW 2044) and Body and Soul (WW 2048). All tracks except "ABC Blues" are also included in the 2007 compilation album, Thad Jones Mel Lewis Orchestra In Europe.

Track listing
Disc 1:
 "Second Race" – 9:30
 "Willow Weep for Me" (Ronell) – 8:45
 "ABC Blues" (Brookmeyer)– 20:05
 "Sixty First and Richard" – 11:25
Disc 2:
 "Body and Soul" (Heyman, Sour, Eyton and Green) – 7:10
 "Don't Get Sassy" – 10:25
 "Child Is Born" – 9:45
 "Fingers" – 14:10
 "Intimacy of the Blues" (Strayhorn) – 16:25
All songs composed by Thad Jones except as noted.

Personnel
 Thad Jones – flugelhorn
 Mel Lewis – drums
 Jim McNeely – piano
 Jasper Lundgaard – bass
 Dick Oatts – alto saxophone
 Steve Coleman – alto saxophone
 Rick Perry – tenor saxophone
 Robert Rockwell – tenor saxophone
 Charles Davis – baritone saxophone
 Ron Tooley – trumpet
 Simo Salminen – trumpet
 Irvin Stokes – trumpet
 Larry Moss – trumpet
 Doug Purviance – trombone
 Lolly Bienenfeld – trombone
 Lee Robertson – trombone
 John Mosca – trombone

References / External Links

 West Wind Jazz WW2048
 West Wind Jazz WW2407
 West Wind Jazz discography
 [ Allmusic]

1978 live albums
The Thad Jones/Mel Lewis Orchestra live albums
West Wind Records live albums